The 1947 Wiley Wildcats football team was an American football team that represented Wiley College in the Southwestern Athletic Conference (SWAC) during the 1947 college football season. In their 25th season under head coach Fred T. Long, the team compiled a 5–3–1 record (3–3–1 against conference opponents), finished in fifth place in the SWAC, and outscored opponents by a total of 126 to 58. Southern ranked No. 8 among the nation's black college football teams according to the Pittsburgh Courier and its Dickinson Rating System.

On October 25, 1947, the team played its first night game at Wiley Field against the Lane Dragons.

Schedule

References

Wiley
Wiley Wildcats football seasons
Wiley Wildcats football